Berthet is a French surname that may refer to

Élie Berthet, (1815–1891), French novelist
Georges Berthet, (1903–1979), French Olympic skier
Gwenaël Berthet (born 1970), French Olympic sailor
 Jean-François Berthet (born 1969), French Olympic sailor, brother of Gwenaël
 Joseph Berthet, French Olympic rower
Lola Berthet, (born 1980), Argentine actress
Marcel Berthet (1888–1953), French cyclist
 Marius Berthet, French Olympic rower
Raymond Berthet (1909–1979), French Olympic cross-country skier, brother of Georges
Rémi Berthet (born 1947), French Olympic judoka
Sébastien Berthet, (born 1978), French professional ice hockey player
Vincent Berthet (born 1960), French Olympic equestrian